Arul may refer to:

People

Given name
 Arul Chinnaiyan
 Arul Kanda Kandasamy
 Arul Kumar Jambunathan, Malaysian politician
 Arul Pragasam
 Arul Ramadas, Indian politician
 Arul Shankar, Indian mathematician
 Arul Suppiah (born 1983), Malaysian cricket player
 Arul Swami (1913–1997), Indian long-distance runner

Surname
 F. V. Arul (1917-2006), Indian police officer
 Noel Arul (1930–1993), Malaysian field hockey player

Other
 Arul (film)